The 2006 ISF Women's World Championship was held from August 27 to September 5, 2006 in Beijing, China. For the sixth consecutive time, the team from the United States won the title, with a 3-0 victory over Japan. The first four teams qualified for the 2008 Olympics. Since China came in fourth, a game for place 5 took place with the winner also qualifying.

Pool Play

Group A

Italy qualified in fourth with superior runs against New Zealand and Great Britain.

Group B

Colombia withdrew and forfeited all their games.

Playoffs

Day One

Chinese Taipei and Venezuela Eliminated.

Day Two

Canada and Italy Eliminated.

Day Three

Canada places 5th and earns spot in 2008 Olympics

Medal Round

Final ranking

References

ISF World Championship
Women's Softball World Championship
S
2006 in Chinese women's sport
Sports competitions in Beijing
Softball competitions in China
2000s in Beijing
Softball World Championship
September 2006 sports events in Asia